Dwyer is an unincorporated community in Grant County, New Mexico, United States. It is located southeast of Silver City, along the Mimbres River, and on NM 61.

History
The settlement, first known as San Jose for its church, had a post office from 1895 to 1917. The post office in Dwyer was moved northeast from Faywood is still named the Faywood Post Office and the settlement was renamed Dwyer for an 1883 homesteader, G.W. Dwyer.

Notable person
G. X. McSherry, farmer, rancher, and member of the New Mexico House of Representatives

See also
 NAN Ranch, National Register of Historic Places
 NAN Ranch Ruin, archaeological site 
 Swarts Ruin, Mimbres culture archaeological site

Notes

Unincorporated communities in Grant County, New Mexico
Unincorporated communities in New Mexico
1895 establishments in New Mexico Territory